The County of Churchill is a county (a cadastral division) in Queensland, Australia.  Like all counties in Queensland, it is a non-functional administrative unit, that is used mainly for the purpose of registering land titles.  The county lies between 152°E and 153°E longitude, and is centred on the West Moreton region, extending east to the suburbs of Ipswich. The county was named for Lord Randolph Churchill, who was born in 1849, by the Surveyor-General of New South Wales the following year; the area was officially named and bounded by the Governor in Council on 7 March 1901 under the Land Act 1897.

Parishes 
Churchill is divided into parishes, as listed below:

See also
 Lands administrative divisions of Queensland

References

Churchill